The 2017 Texas A&M–Commerce Lions football team represented Texas A&M University–Commerce in the 2017 NCAA Division II football season. They were led by head coach Colby Carthel, who was in his fifth season at Texas A&M-Commerce. The Lions played their home games at Memorial Stadium and were members of the Lone Star Conference. The Lions won the NCAA Division II Football Championship. Quarterback Luis Perez also won the Harlon Hill Trophy.

Previous season
The 2016 team finished with an overall record of 11–2 and ranked no. 9 in the final AFCA poll. The Lions lost only one regular season game, 25–26 to instate rival Midwestern State, and were Lone Star Conference champions. The team made the NCAA Division II Postseason Tournament, defeating no. 5 Colorado Mesa 34–23 in the regional quarterfinal, but lost to no. 1 Grand Valley State 32–55 in the semifinals round.

Schedule
Texas A&M–Commerce announced its 2017 football schedule on December 12, 2016. The schedule consisted of five home and away games in the regular season. The Lions hosted LSC foes Angelo State, Eastern New Mexico, Texas-Permian Basin, and Western New Mexico and traveled to Midwestern State, Tarleton State, Texas A&M–Kingsville, and West Texas A&M

The Lions hosted one of the two non-conference games against William Jewell from the Great Lakes Valley Conference and traveled to North Alabama from the Gulf South Conference.

Schedule Source:

Roster

Game summaries

at No. 6 North Alabama

The Lions started the 2017 season on the road against the no. 6 North Alabama Lions from the Gulf South Conference. The game was originally scheduled to be played a day earlier, on August 31, but was postponed due to Hurricane Harvey.

The first half was a defensive battle between the two teams, with only two drives not ending in a punt, both by North Alabama. The first drive was in the first quarter when Dre Hall caught a 20-yard pass from Blake Hawkins to put North Alabama up 7–0 following Chandlr Carrera's kick. The second drive occurred in the second quarter when Carrera missed a 37-yard field goal. Commerce would finally get on the board on its first drive of the second half, with Kristov Martinez making a 30-yard field goal. On North Alabama's following possession, Carrera would miss another field goal, this time from 42 yards. Commerce's next three drives would end with Luis Perez throwing an interception. Commerce would score again with 4:18 left when Blake Hawkins was tackled in his own endzone by Chris Smith, resulting in a safety. On the following drive, Martinez would make a 30-yard field goal to give Commerce a 8–7 lead with 1:12 left. North Alabama attempted a 55-yard field goal on the next drive, this time by Joe Gurley, but the kicked was blocked and recovered by Commerce with 12 seconds remaining in the game.

William Jewell

Eastern New Mexico

at Texas A&M–Kingsville

at No. 10 Midwestern State

Western New Mexico

Angelo State

at West Texas A&M

Texas–Permian Basin

at Tarleton State

at No. 12 Winona State (Regional Quarterfinal)

at No. 7 Central Washington (Regional semifinal)

The Lions traveled to Ellensburg, Washington to face the no. 7 Wildcats in the regional semifinal of the Division II playoffs. Texas A&M–Commerce trailed Eastern Washington 28–7 at halftime, but scored 21 unanswered points in the second half to tie the game. The two teams traded field goals in the first overtime period, with the Lions' Kristov Martinez making a 38-yard field goal in the second overtime period to win the game and advance to the Regional Final.

at No. 1 Minnesota State (Regional Final)

Harding (National semifinal)

vs. West Florida (NCAA Division II National Championship Game)

Rankings

Statistics

Scoring
Scores against non-conference opponents

Scores against the Lonestar Conference

Scores against all opponents

References

External links
 2017 football roster

Texas AandM-Commerce
Texas A&M–Commerce Lions football seasons
NCAA Division II Football Champions
Texas AandM-Commerce Lions football